The white-faced spiny tree-rat (Echimys chrysurus) is a spiny rat species from South America. It is found in Brazil, French Guiana, Guyana and Suriname.

The main diagnostic character state of this Echimys species is the presence of a dorsal white median stripe on the head. As compared to Echimys vieirai and Echimys saturnus, E. chrysurus also possesses a brighter dorsum.

References

Echimys
Mammals described in 1780
Taxa named by Eberhard August Wilhelm von Zimmermann